South African women toured Bangladesh in January 2017. The tour consisted of a series of five Women's One Day Internationals (WODIs). South African women were previously scheduled to tour Bangladesh in October 2015 for series of three WODIs and four Women's Twenty20 Internationals (WT20Is), but the tour was abandoned with no official statement from either BCB or CSA.

South Africa women won the series 4–1.

Squads

WODI series

1st WODI

2nd WODI

3rd WODI

4th WODI

5th WODI

References

External links
 Series home at ESPN Cricinfo

Bang
cricket
International cricket competitions in 2016–17
2017 in Bangladeshi cricket
2017 in South African cricket
2017 in women's cricket
South 2017
2017 in Bangladeshi women's sport